Phrynoponera pulchella is a species of ant in the subfamily Ponerinae. It was discovered and described by Bolton, B. & Fisher, B. L. in 2008.

References

External links

Ponerinae
Hymenoptera of Africa
Insects described in 2008